The 2021–22 season was Dundee's first season back in the top flight of Scottish football since 2018–19, after winning the previous season's Premiership play-offs. Dundee also competed in both the League Cup and the Scottish Cup.

Dundee were automatically relegated to the Scottish Championship on 11 May 2022.

Season summary

July 
Dundee would top their League Cup group stage with four wins from four, including a 3–0 forfeited win over Ross County on top of wins over Brora Rangers, Montrose and Forfar Athletic to qualify for the Second Round. They ended the month with their first Scottish Premiership game since James McPake's first game in May 2019, with both coincidentally against St Mirren. Dundee would come from behind twice to take a point.

August 
Dundee would suffer a massive defeat away to Celtic, but would rebound strongly in the League Cup Second Round with a home victory over Motherwell. Despite going ahead early against Hibernian, the Dee would require a late equaliser to snatch a point at Dens. The week after, Motherwell would get revenge for their cup defeat with a league win over Dundee, even after going down to 10 men.

September 
After losing captain Charlie Adam in the previous game, Dundee failed to capitalise on a dominant performance at home to Livingston and had to take a goalless draw. They once again failed to find the net and conceded a late goal in the Dundee derby to go bottom of the league. In the League Cup quarter-final a few days later, Dundee again failed to take their chances and suffered defeat to cup holders St Johnstone. Dundee's string of valiant performances marred by impotency in front of goal continued with a tight defeat to league champions Rangers.

October 
After failing to score for four consecutive games, Dundee finally found the back of the net with Ryan Sweeney's header away to St Johnstone, though it did little to change an otherwise horrendous 3–1 defeat. Charlie Adam would return in Dundee's next game against a similarly struggling Aberdeen side, and managed to defeat the Dons in the league for the first time since 2004, though would pay the price of losing midfielder Shaun Byrne to injury. Despite struggling to keep up with in-form Hearts, a late Jason Cummings goal was enough to take a point at Tynecastle. In a key game at home against relegation rivals Ross County however, Dundee's building momentum crashed to a halt after going 4 goals behind in the first half, eventually losing 0–5. Despite this humiliation however, the Dees would bounce back brilliantly with their first away win of the season in Paisley against St Mirren, keeping a clean sheet to boot, though they would lose striker Cillian Sheridan for the season with an Achilles tendon rupture.

November 
Despite showing better fight against Celtic at home, their defensive struggles continued with a 2–4 loss. After a 3-week break, Dundee came back with a bang in a decisive 3–0 win over an in-form Motherwell side, but would once again lose a key player to injury in a big win with defender Lee Ashcroft damaging his hamstring.

December 
Dundee secured back-to-back wins with a 1–0 home win over bogey side St Johnstone, hopping up to 9th place. Their momentum would be inevitably halted at Ibrox Stadium as they were picked apart by Rangers. They would take the lead over Ross County despite losing Charlie Adam again to injury via a Luke McCowan double, but could not hold it together and would suffer defeat in Dingwall. A valiant defensive performance at Easter Road was undone by a freak own goal that would be enough for a Dundee defeat. Dundee would be very short-staffed in their next match against Hearts due to various injuries piling up, a suspension for Ryan Sweeney and Jason Cummings being dismissed from training due to showing up 'unfit to train'. Despite another even game in misty conditions, a late Hearts goal was enough to seal a fourth straight defeat for the Dee. Despite taking the lead early, the tired and depleted side were once again just beaten by Aberdeen. Their remaining games in December were rearranged due to the SPFL moving the winter break forward at the request of the clubs, including Dundee.

January 
Despite their early reprieve, Dundee returned to their miserable run of form with another goalless loss, in particular away from home against Livingston. In a brief break from their losing run in the league, the side were able to reclaim some form with a win, albeit unconvincing, away to Scottish League One side Dumbarton in the Scottish Cup. In a crucial game shortly after between the two bottom sides in terrible form, a rather unsurprisingly poor 0–0 fails to separate Dundee from last-placed St Johnstone in Perth.

February 
Dundee would have to accept another scoreless draw and dropping to bottom spot against rivals Dundee United. In yet another vital game in order to try and fend off relegation, Dundee again fell to Ross County and their gap at the bottom would only increase. Despite the previous failures to defeat relegation rivals, the Dark Blues pulled out a gutsy come-from-behind win over Europe-chasing Hearts to lift them off the bottom spot. Dundee continued their improving form by taking their chances against League One side Peterhead in the Scottish Cup 5th round to win 0–3 at Balmoor. Despite the two positive results prior however, manager James McPake was released by the club on 16 February. The next day, Mark McGhee was announced as manager for the remainder of the season. McGhee's first game as manager was an impressive performance against league leaders Celtic, but missed out on a point in the dying minutes. Any optimism that was brought about from their performance at Celtic Park however was swiftly crushed in another battering at home, this time to Livingston in a 0–4 romp.

March 
The side would get their first point under McGhee with a goalless draw at home to Hibs, but failed to take advantage of a Rocky Bushiri red card and a chance to move from the bottom of the table. After again being hit by a mix of injuries and COVID-19 isolation periods, a depleted Dundee ground out another draw away to Motherwell. After two postponed attempts, the Dees finally welcomed St Mirren for their game in hand, but were sucker-punched with a last-minute Buddies goal to slip into near unsalvageable trouble. The Dees would get to forget their league troubles briefly in the Scottish Cup quarter-finals, but would be knocked out by Rangers without much of a fight. In a league rematch with Rangers the following week, Dundee would improve their performance and lead the majority of the game, but eventually falter and lose 1–2, confirming them as being 4 points adrift at the bottom going into April.

April 
Dundee would come back twice from deficits at home to Aberdeen, but they would still fall two points further behind in bottom spot regardless. Despite trailing behind by two the following week in the Dundee derby, Dundee would again make a comeback with two goals in two minutes to earn a point at Tannadice. In a must-win game against second-bottom side St Johnstone, Dundee couldn't take advantage of an early goal and could only muster a point. In another close-fought match at Pittodrie, an Aberdeen penalty was the difference and Dundee stumbled to their eleventh straight winless game, all of which occurring under Mark McGhee.

May 
A miserable performance in Paisley nearly saw Dundee relegated with two games to go, but a last-minute Livingston goal against St Johnstone kept them alive, if only mathematically. The Dark Blues managed to break their 12-game winless streak with a home win over Hibernian to again keep themselves just barely afloat in the league. Despite their late efforts however, a St Johnstone win over Aberdeen the next night would confirm Dundee's relegation. After relegation was confirmed, Dundee would announce that they would not renew Mark McGhee's contract and would look for a new manager for next season. Dundee would end their season in poetic fashion with another late collapse against Livingston.

Competitions 
   

All times are in British Summer Time (BST).

All future fixtures are to be confirmed.

Pre-season and friendlies

Scottish Premiership 

Dundee will play against Aberdeen, Celtic, Dundee United, Heart of Midlothian, Hibernian, Livingston, Motherwell, Rangers, Ross County, St Johnstone, and St Mirren in the 2021–22 Premiership campaign. They will play each team three times, twice at home and once away against half of the teams, and once at home and twice away against the other half. Following this, they will be split into either a top or bottom group of six depending on their result after 33 games, where they will play each team in their group once.

League table

Results by round

Scottish Cup 

Dundee entered the competition in the 4th round.

Scottish League Cup 

Dundee were a 2nd seed in the group stage draw which took place on 28 May at 13:00 on FreeSports and the SPFL's YouTube channel. Dundee were drawn into Group C along with Ross County, Forfar Athletic, Montrose, and Brora Rangers.

Group stage 

Notes

Knockout stage

Group C table

Squad statistics 

|-
|colspan="14"|Players away from the club on loan:

|-
|colspan="14"|Players who left the club during the season:

|}

Transfers

Summer

Players in

Players out

Winter & end of season

Players in

Players out

See also 

 List of Dundee F.C. seasons

References 

Dundee F.C. seasons
Dundee